An Jeong-geun (born 20 November 1924) is a South Korean former sports shooter. He competed in the trap event at the 1964 Summer Olympics.

References

External links

1924 births
Possibly living people
South Korean male sport shooters
Olympic shooters of South Korea
Shooters at the 1964 Summer Olympics
Sport shooters from Seoul
Keio University alumni
20th-century South Korean physicians